Alias Smith and Jones is an American Western series that originally aired on ABC from January 1971 to January 1973. The show initially starred Pete Duel as Hannibal Heyes and Ben Murphy as Jedediah "Kid" Curry, outlaw cousins who are trying to reform. The governor offers them a clemency deal on two conditions: that they keep the agreement a secret, and that they will remain wanted fugitives until the governor decides that they should receive a formal amnesty.

Plot
Operating primarily in Wyoming Territory (1868–1890), cousins Hannibal Heyes and Jedediah "Kid" Curry (whose boyish face spawned the nickname) are the two most successful outlaws in the history of the West. However, crime-fighting methods are evolving to foil them; safes are becoming harder to crack, trains more difficult to stop, and posses more adept at tracking them down.

Heyes, the brains of the Devil's Hole Gang, falls in disfavor with fellow members. Deciding to give up their life of crime, he and Curry learn of an amnesty program founded by the territorial governor. Through an old acquaintance, Sheriff Lom Trevors (James Drury in the pilot, alternately Mike Road and John Russell in the series), they contact the governor, who is unsure of how voters will react if he extends leniency to Heyes and Curry. He ultimately strikes a deal to grant them amnesty for their past crimes, with the stipulations that they must not discuss the agreement with anyone and that they will officially still be wanted men until such time as the governor decides that they deserve full clemency.

The cousins reluctantly accept the deal, but find life as law-abiding citizens to be more difficult than expected. Now calling themselves Joshua Smith and Thaddeus Jones, they find themselves tangling with lawmen, bounty hunters, operatives of the Bannerman Detective Agency (a fictional alias for the Pinkerton Detective Agency), and other nefarious figures. They are forced to rely on Heyes' silver tongue, Curry's fast draw, and occasionally a little help from friends on both sides of the law.

Cast and characters
Heyes was deemed "cunning," with Curry "gunning." Heyes/Smith was considered the brains of the duo and an excellent poker player. Curry/Jones was the master gun hand and the brawn. Usually, Heyes figured out ways to make money and save the twosome from precarious situations. Starting with "The Man Who Broke the Bank at Red Gap" (season two, episode 16), a slightly revamped introduction partially explained why the renowned duo did not split to evade capture—they were cousins. Roger Davis' original theme voiceover referred to the characters as "latter-day Robin Hoods." The new introduction replaced that description with the phrase "Kansas cousins." It remained so after Ralph Story reworked the introduction, once Davis assumed the Heyes role. After Davis took over as Heyes, his distinctive voice could no longer be used in the theme introduction. Ralph Story was brought in to provide narration for the series (he, rather than Davis, had done so in the pilot).

When the cousins were children, all four of their parents were slaughtered during the "border wars" just before the Civil War (q.v. Kansas-Missouri Border War) ("The Men That Corrupted Hadleyburg", season two, episode 17). In "The Man Who Broke the Bank at Red Gap," Heyes remarks, "My cousin and I are not Hannibal Heyes and Kid Curry." Curry also speaks of their "sage old grandfather." In the first episode with Davis, "The Biggest Game in the West" (season two, episode 19), Heyes shouts to Curry: "Yes sir! Cousin, you're all right!" In the episode "Don't Get Mad, Get Even," Curry and Heyes both make reference to their Irish grandfather Curry.

Recurring characters include:
Kyle Murtry (Dennis Fimple) and Wheat Carlson (Earl Holliman), members of the Devil's Hole Gang, formerly led by Heyes and Curry.
Harry Briscoe (J. D. Cannon) is a Bannerman detective who occasionally finds himself on the wrong side of the law.
Patrick "Big Mac" McCreedy (Burl Ives) and Señor Nestor Armendariz (Cesar Romero) are two ranchers on opposite sides of the U.S.-Mexico border/Rio Grande waging a feud over a valuable bust which represents land that had been owned by Armendariz until the river temporarily switched course, moving the border with it, allowing MacCreedy to sell the land. Heyes and Curry get stuck in the middle.
Clementine "Clem" Hale (Sally Field) is an old friend who has no problem with blackmailing the reformed outlaws when necessary. Field had appeared in only one episode before Duel's death, and she could not return due to being pregnant with her second child. Several scripts intended for her were rewritten to feature Georgette "George" Sinclair, who was played by Michele Lee. In the third season, Field did appear as Clem one last time, doing love scenes with former Flying Nun co-star Alejandro Rey.
Soapy Saunders (Sam Jaffe) and Silky O'Sullivan (Walter Brennan) are retired confidence men on whom the boys call when in need of a large sum of cash and a good con to get them out of trouble.

Recasting of Hannibal Heyes
In the early morning hours of December 31, 1971, series star Pete Duel died of a self-inflicted gunshot wound at the age of 31. He was reportedly suffering from depression and had been drinking heavily when he shot himself. Upon learning of Duel's death, executive producer Jo Swerling Jr. initially wanted to end the series, but ABC refused. Swerling later stated:

ABC said, "No way!" They said, "You have a contract to deliver this show to us, and you will continue to deliver the show as best you can on schedule or we will sue you." Hearing those words, Universal didn't hesitate for a second to instruct us to stay in production. We were already a little bit behind the eight ball on airdates. So, we contacted everybody, including Ben (Murphy), and told them to come back in. The entire company was reassembled and back in production by one o'clock that day shooting scenes that did not involve Peter — only 12 hours after his death.

Series writer, director, and producer Roy Huggins contacted actor Roger Davis (who provided narration for the series, and who had also appeared in episode 19 "Smiler with a Gun") the day of Duel's death to fill the role of Hannibal Heyes, and actor/voice man Paul Frees came in to loop Duel's unfinished ADR on "The Men That Corrupted Hadleyburg". Davis was fitted for costumes the following day, and began reshooting scenes Duel had previously completed for an unfinished episode the following Monday. According to Swerling, the decision to continue production so soon after Duel's death was heavily criticized in the press at the time.

Production

Development
Alias Smith and Jones began with a made-for-TV movie of the previous year called The Young Country about con artists in the Old West. It was produced, written, and directed by Roy Huggins, who served as executive producer of the show.  Under the pseudonym John Thomas James, Huggins shared the writing credit on most episodes of the series that followed.  It was broadcast on 17 March 1970 in the ABC Movie of the Week strand.

Roger Davis starred as Stephen Foster Moody, and Pete Duel had the secondary but significant role of Honest John Smith. Joan Hackett played a character called Clementine Hale; a character with the same name appeared in two Alias Smith and Jones episodes, played by Sally Field. This pilot was rejected, but Huggins was given a second chance and, with Glen A. Larson, developed Alias Smith and Jones. As with the previously rejected pilot The Young Country, this series pilot proper also aired as an ABC Movie of the Week.

It was made in the same spirit as many other American TV series of the time, from Huggins' own The Fugitive to Renegade, about fugitives on the run across America who get involved in the personal lives of the people they meet. The major difference was that Hannibal Heyes and Kid Curry were guilty of the crimes for which they were accused, but were trying to begin a noncriminal life.

The series was modeled on the 1969 film Butch Cassidy and the Sundance Kid, starring Paul Newman and Robert Redford. (Universal contract player Ben Murphy was offered to the producers because he was considered a Paul Newman lookalike.) A number of similarities are seen between the film and the TV series: One of the lead characters in the film was called Harvey Logan (played by Ted Cassidy). In real life, Harvey Logan, also known by the nickname of Kid Curry, was an associate of the real Butch Cassidy, and unlike the TV version, was a cold-blooded killer.

The TV series also featured a group of robbers called the Devil's Hole Gang, loosely based on the Hole in the Wall Gang from which Cassidy recruited most of his outlaws. To lend them an element of audience sympathy, Heyes and Curry were presented as men who avoided bloodshed (though Curry did once kill in self-defense) and always were attempting to reform and seek redemption for their "prior ways".

The names "Smith" and "Jones" originated from a line in the 1969 film Butch Cassidy and the Sundance Kid, when before one of their final hold-ups, the characters are outside a bank in Bolivia and Sundance turns to Butch and says: "I'm Smith and you're Jones."

Locations
Parts of the television series were filmed at Castle Valley and Professor Valley in Utah.

Cancellation
The series continued for another 17 episodes after the recasting of Hannibal Heyes, but never regained its popularity after the loss of Duel. This, as well as the fact that the long-prominent Western genre was giving way to police dramas, brought the show to an end on January 13, 1973. On January 16, 1973, Bonanza aired its final episode, leaving the 18-year-old Gunsmoke, the syndicated comedy western Dusty's Trail, and Kung Fu as the only Westerns scheduled for Fall 1973.

Episodes

Home media
The entire series has been released on DVD.

Universal Studios Home Entertainment released the complete first season of Alias Smith and Jones in Region 2 on June 11, 2007.

Original tie-in novels
American Western author Todhunter Ballard, better known as W.T. Ballard, wrote six original novels based on the series, under his tie-in pseudonym "Brian Fox." Only the first two were published in the United States, by Award Books, between 1971 and 1972. The television series, however, was so popular in the UK that after first run episodes were exhausted, the first two novels were reprinted and distributed by London-based publisher Tandem Books, who also released the four additional titles, all in 1976. Since Award and Tandem were affiliated publishers, it's unclear if Award commissioned all six books and dropped the book series as the show's American popularity waned, unwittingly leaving the then-unpublished manuscripts to be rejuvenated later. or if Tandem returned to Ballard for the additional titles.

Each book is a standalone novel and they can be read in any order. Following, however, is the order of publication.
 Dead Ringer (1971)
 The Outlaw Trail (1972)
 Cabin Fever (1976)
 Apache Gold (1976)
 Dragooned (1976)
 Trick Shot (1976)

References in other works
The title was spoofed in the 1980s British comedy series Alas Smith and Jones.
In his comedy book Lolly Scramble, comedian Tony Martin makes reference to the irony of the opening narration "they never shot anyone!" with Duel only ultimately shooting himself. Even more bizarre, as Martin remarks, the person reading that line took over Duel's role.
In episode 6 of series 1 of The Fall and Rise of Reginald Perrin, while Reggie is pretending to be dead and staying in a bed-sit, the lights go out whenever the landlady watches BBC2, "she is an aficionado of Alias Smith and Jones".

References

External links
 
Alias Smith & Jones Collection
Alias Smith & Jones Image Library

1970s Western (genre) television series
1971 American television series debuts
1973 American television series endings
ABC Movie of the Week
American Broadcasting Company original programming
English-language television shows
Period television series
Television series by Universal Television
Television series created by Glen A. Larson
Television series set in the 19th century
Television shows filmed in Utah
Television shows set in Wyoming